Sebastián Rodríguez Veloso (born on 27 February 1957) is a Spanish Paralympic swimmer. He has competed at four Paralympic Games winning fifteen medals: eight gold, four silver and three bronze. His attendance at the Games was controversial after it was revealed that he had been jailed for bomb attacks while a member of First of October Anti-Fascist Resistance Groups (GRAPO).

Early life and criminal activities

Rodríguez was born in Cadiz, Andalusia, Spain on 27 February 1957.  He is nicknamed Chano.

In the 1980s he was a member of the Spanish terrorist organisation First of October Anti-Fascist Resistance Groups. In 1984, at the age of 26, he was jailed for 84 years for his role in the murder of Seville business leader Rafael Padura and a series of bomb attacks.

In 1990 while in prison he went on hunger strike for 432 days, leaving his health permanently damaged and resulting in him losing the use of his legs. He was released on parole from prison in 1994 under a Spanish law which says that the seriously ill should not be jailed, and in 2007 he was pardoned by the Spanish Government.

Swimming
Rodríguez is an S5 swimmer.  In his swimming career, he has earned over 20 total medals.  His training base is Vigo.

In 2010, Rodríguez competed at the Tenerife International Open.  Rodríguez competed at the 2010 Adapted Swimming World Championship in the Netherlands.  In advance of the competition,  he attended a swimming camp with the national team that was part of the Paralympic High Performance Program (HARP Program).  He competed at the 2011 IPC European Swimming Championships in Berlin, Germany.  He earned a gold medal.  He almost finished first in the  4x50 meter freestyle relay with teammates Richard Oribe, Alvaro Bayona and Jordi Gordillo but a bad touch led to disqualification. He competed at the 2013 IPC Swimming World Championships.

Paralympics
Rodríguez first competed at the Paralympics at the 2000 Sydney Games. He took part having told Spanish officials that he lost his legs in a traffic accident, but he lost his leg  during a hunger strike during its years in prison. He won five gold medals at the Games and set four new world records. Three of his golds came in individual freestyle events in the S5 classification, as he set world records in the 50 metres, 100 metres and 200 metres. He also won gold medals as part of the Spanish relay teams in the 4×50 m freestyle 20 pts and the 4×50 m medley 20 pts, setting a new world record in the freestyle relay. The truth about how he came to be disabled was revealed by a Spanish newspaper during the Games, which led to calls for him to return his medals; however, his participation was backed by politicians from his home town.

At the 2004 Summer Paralympics held in Athens, Greece, Rodriguez won a further three gold medals. He successfully defended his titles in the 50 m, 100 m and 200 m freestyle events, setting new world records in the final of each event.

In 2008 he competed in his third Paralympics at the Beijing Games in China. Rodríguez won four medals: silvers in the 200 m freestyle and the 4×50 m freestyle 20 pts, and bronze medals in the 50 m freestyle and the 4×50 m medley relay 20 pts.

His fourth Paralympic appearance came at the 2012 Games in London, United Kingdom. He won three medals at the Games;  silvers in the 50 m freestyle and 200 m freestyle, and a bronze in the 100 m.

References

External links 
 
 

1957 births
Living people
Paralympic swimmers of Spain
Paralympic gold medalists for Spain
Paralympic silver medalists for Spain
Paralympic bronze medalists for Spain
Paralympic medalists in swimming
S5-classified Paralympic swimmers
Swimmers at the 2000 Summer Paralympics
Swimmers at the 2004 Summer Paralympics
Swimmers at the 2008 Summer Paralympics
Swimmers at the 2012 Summer Paralympics
Medalists at the 2000 Summer Paralympics
Medalists at the 2004 Summer Paralympics
Medalists at the 2008 Summer Paralympics
Medalists at the 2012 Summer Paralympics
Medalists at the World Para Swimming Championships
Medalists at the World Para Swimming European Championships
Sportspeople from Cádiz
Terrorism in Spain
People convicted on terrorism charges
People convicted of murder by Spain
Spanish people convicted of murder
Recipients of Spanish royal pardons
1983 murders in Spain
Swimmers at the 2020 Summer Paralympics
Spanish male freestyle swimmers